The Michigan Central Railway Bridge is an out-of-service steel arch bridge spanning the Niagara Gorge between Niagara Falls, Ontario and Niagara Falls, New York. The bridge is owned by Canadian Pacific Railway, which purchased the single track structure in 1990. The Canadian corridor and bridge are owned by the City of Niagara Falls, Ontario. The bridge is located just upstream from the older arch-style Whirlpool Rapids Bridge used by Maple Leaf Amtrak passenger trains.

History

The bridge was designed by William Perry Taylor, Chief Engineer J.L. Delming and consulting Norwegian-born engineer Olaf Hoff. Construction on the bridge began in 1924, and the bridge opened in 1925. This bridge replaced the Niagara Cantilever Bridge that crossed in the same area from 1883 to 1925. The main traffic across the bridge were trains operated by the New York Central, Penn Central, Conrail, and Canadian Pacific Railway. It was also used briefly from October 1978 to January 31, 1979 by Amtrak's former Niagara Rainbow service which ran between New York City and Detroit via Niagara Falls and Windsor, Ontario. The bridge was abandoned in 2001 after a deal was reached between the City of Niagara Falls, Ontario and Canadian Pacific to stop service on the line that the bridge was part of because the line ran through the tourist district of the city and was considered a nuisance and safety issue.

Today the bridge no longer carries train traffic and the tracks have been removed both on the bridge and on the line leading to it. There is currently a wall across the centre of the bridge that is topped with barbed wire to prevent people from walking across it. Additional barrier and barbed wire is located on the sides to prevent climbing on the steel arch sections. A wired fence blocks the east side (American) and another wall blocks the west side (in Canada). The line leading to the bridge on the Canadian side is now partially a rail trail. Niagara Fallsview Casino Resort was also built on part of the line in 2004. On the American side, most traces of the line leading to the bridge from the Niagara Subdivision are gone completely. Construction of a new Amtrak station in 2016 removed the bridge over Main Street that connected the line to the subdivision and fenced in a portion of the former line across from the new station for security purposes, making it into a gravel lot area for U.S. Customs and Border Protection. A New York State project in 2019 that removed the Niagara Scenic Parkway viaduct and created park space in its place also removed the bridge over Whirlpool Street and the trestle connector leaving the bridge with no connection on the American side.

See also
 
 
 
 
 List of crossings of the Niagara River

References

External links

 Bridges Over The Niagara River
 Detailed information on the construction of this bridge

Bridges completed in 1925
Bridges in Niagara Falls, New York
Bridges in Niagara Falls, Ontario
Railway bridges in the Regional Municipality of Niagara
Bridges over the Niagara River
Canadian Pacific Railway bridges in Ontario
Canadian Pacific Railway bridges in the United States
Former railway bridges in Canada
Former railway bridges in the United States
Michigan Central Railroad bridges
Open-spandrel deck arch bridges in Canada
Open-spandrel deck arch bridges in the United States
Railroad bridges in New York (state)
Steel bridges in Canada
Steel bridges in the United States
Truss arch bridges in Canada
Truss arch bridges in the United States